Pseudomops septentrionalis, the pale bordered field cockroach or firefly roach, is a species of cockroach in the family Ectobiidae. It is found in Central America and North America.

References

External links

 

Cockroaches
Articles created by Qbugbot
Insects described in 1917